The Alabama Register of Landmarks and Heritage, commonly referred to as the Alabama Register, is an official listing of buildings, sites, structures, objects, and districts deemed worthy of preservation in the U.S. state of Alabama. These properties, which may be of national, state, and local significance, are designated by the Alabama Historical Commission. The designation is honorary and carries no direct restrictions or incentives.  The register includes properties such as cemeteries, churches, moved properties, reconstructed properties, and properties at least 40 years old which may not normally qualify for listing in the National Register of Historic Places.  There are approximately 1421 properties and districts listed on the Alabama Register.  Of these, approximately 196 are also listed on the National Register of Historic Places and 5 are designated as National Historic Landmarks.

Nomination

The Alabama Register was created by the Alabama Historical Commission to provide the public with a fast and easy way to bring recognition to historic properties.  People interested in historic recognition in Alabama are encouraged to begin with the Alabama Register of Landmarks and Heritage program.  Nominations may be submitted by anyone to the Alabama Historical Commission. A staff review committee then determines if the nominated property meets the established selection criteria and the property is added to the register if the criteria are met.

Property nominations for the Alabama Register also help the Alabama Historical Commission determine whether or not a property is eligible for listing in the National Register.

Selection criteria
General criteria for inclusion in the Alabama Register includes that the property be at least 40 years old and be associated with events of state or local significance, associated with the lives of persons of state or local significance, representative of a type, style, or period of architecture, or associated with Alabama’s history or prehistory.  It should also possess integrity of location and construction and convey a feeling for the time and place of construction.

Structures that have been moved from their original locations, reconstructed historic buildings, and properties that are less than 40 years old are not usually considered for inclusion.  Those that have been moved or reconstructed may be considered if they have been sensitively relocated to a site similar to the original, closely match the construction of the original significant building, or are of exceptional importance to the state.

Listings by county
Properties on the Alabama Register of Landmarks and Heritage by county (Autauga–Choctaw)
Properties on the Alabama Register of Landmarks and Heritage by county (Clarke–Dallas)
Properties on the Alabama Register of Landmarks and Heritage by county (DeKalb–Jackson)
Properties on the Alabama Register of Landmarks and Heritage by county (Jefferson–Macon) 
Properties on the Alabama Register of Landmarks and Heritage by county (Madison–Perry)
Properties on the Alabama Register of Landmarks and Heritage by county (Pickens–Winston)

See also
History of Alabama
National Register of Historic Places listings in Alabama

Footnotes

References

External links
Alabama Register of Landmarks and Heritage